Eubacterium aggregans is a Gram-positive, homoacetogenic, non-spore-forming and anaerobic bacterium from the genus of Eubacterium which has been isolated from olive mill wastewater in Tunisia

References

 

Eubacteriaceae
Bacteria described in 2000